Peter Philip Mailhes (March 9, 1894 – May 23, 1965)   was a college football player and coach for the Tulane Green Wave football team of Tulane University. Mailhes was inducted into the Tulane Athletics Hall of Fame in 1998.

Tulane University

Playing career

Football
He was a prominent tackle and fullback for the Tulane Green Wave. He was "the greatest Tulane lineman of his day."

1915
He was  captain and All-Southern  for the 1915 team. One source describes him as "One of the greatest tackles of the South and captain of his eleven. Equally famed in baseball, basketball, track and field athletics.

Baseball
Mailhes also played baseball.

Coaching career
He then was a long-standing member of the Tulane coaching staff.

References

American football tackles
American football fullbacks
Tulane Green Wave football players
Tulane Green Wave football coaches
All-Southern college football players
Players of American football from New Orleans
1894 births
1965 deaths
Tulane Green Wave baseball players
Baseball players from New Orleans